Laennecia or Laënnecia is a genus of flowering plants in the family Asteraceae. The plants are native to Mesoamerica, South America, and the southwestern United States. Common name is "horseweed."

 Species
 Laennecia altoandina (Cabrera) G.L.Nesom - Jujuy in Argentina, 	La Paz in Bolivia, Cusco in Peru
 Laennecia araneosa (Urb.) G.Sancho & Pruski - 	Dominican Republic
 Laennecia artemisiifolia (Meyen & Walp.) G.L.Nesom
 Laennecia chihuahuana G.L.Nesom - Chihuahua
 Laennecia confusa (Cronquist) G.L.Nesom - Chiapas, Guatemala, Costa Rica
 Laennecia coulteri (A.Gray) G.L.Nesom - Mexico (Coahuila, Nuevo León, Sonora), United States (CA NV AZ UT CO NM TX AL)
 Laennecia eriophylla (A.Gray) G.L.Nesom - Arizona (Pima, Santa Cruz, Cochise Counties)
 Laennecia filaginoides DC. - Central America, Colombia, Ecuador, Venezuela, Mexico, Texas
 Laennecia gnaphalioides (Kunth) Cass. - Chiapas, Oaxaca, Central America, Colombia, Ecuador, Peru, Bolivia, Venezuela
 Laennecia microglossa (S.F.Blake) G.L.Nesom - 	Nuevo León
 Laennecia pimana G.L.Nesom & Laferr. - Chihuahua
 Laennecia schiedeana (Less.) G.L.Nesom - Central America, Mexico, USA (AZ CO NM)
 Laennecia sophiifolia (Kunth) G.L.Nesom - South America, Mesoamerica, USA (AZ TX NM)
 Laennecia spellenbergii G.L.Nesom - Durango
 Laennecia turnerorum G.L.Nesom - Texas (Brewster County)

References

Astereae
Asteraceae genera